Duc d'Aquitaine was a 64-gun East Indiaman of the Compagnie des Indes, launched in 1754. On 30 May 1757, she was captured by the Royal Navy and commissioned as the third rate HMS Duc D'Aquitaine. She foundered in 1761 and was lost.

Construction
She was assessed at 1,358 tons Builder's Old Measurement, with a displacement of about 2,300 tons. Propulsion was by sails, and she was rigged as a full-rigged ship.

Armament
Provision was made for her to carry 64 guns. As built, she was armed with 4×36-pounder guns and 16×12 pounder guns, giving a broadside of 168 livres. Her complement was 260, comprised eleven officers and 249 men. By 1757, she had been equipped with 50×18-pounder guns, giving a broadside of 450 livres. Her complement was now 493.

Merchant service
Duc d'Acquitaine was built by Nicholas Levasseur at Lorient, Brittany for the Compagnie des Indes. Her keel was laid in September 1753. She was launched on 22 July 1754 and commissioned in January 1755 under the command of capitaine d'Esquelen.

Capture
Duc d'Acquitaine was a casualty of the Seven Years' War. In May 1757, she departed from Lisbon, Portugal with orders to capture . During her cruise, she catured a British merchant brig, which was ransomed for £200. Duc d'Acquitaine struck her colours after a 45-minute battle. She lost 50 crew, with 22 severely wounded and many more wounded. HMS Eagle lost ten crew with 32 wounded. HMS Medway had ten wounded.

Naval service
Duc d'Acquitaine lost all her masts in the battle. She was taken to Plymouth Dockyard, Devon, Great Britain for assessment. On 23 June 1757, she was purchased by the Admiralty for £12,310, 0s, 0d, keeping her name. She was placed under the command of Washington Shirley on 7 March 1758. Refitting was completed in April at a cost of £4,596, 14s, 6d. Her complement was 590 men. On 5 June, she participated in the Raid on St Malo. Between December 1758 and March 1759, she was refitted at Plymouth Dockyard at a cost of £14,543, 14s, 2d. She was placed under the command of captain Sir William Hewett on 29 January. HMS Duc d'Acquitaine departed for the East Indies on 14 April.

Fate
On 1 January 1761, HMS Duc d'Aquitaine was caught in a cyclone off Pondicherry, India She had been anchored and attempted to go out to sea, but was unable to and so reanchored. The storm overwhelmed her and she foundered; only 19 men survived. The same storm claimed four other warships as well.  foundered in much the same manner as HMS Duc D'Aquitaine, and with a similar outcome.

Notes

References

Sources

Lavery, Brian (2003) The Ship of the Line - Volume 1: The development of the battlefleet 1650-1850. Conway Maritime Press. .

1754 ships
Ships built in Lorient
Merchant ships of France
Full-rigged ships
Ships of the line of the Royal Navy
Captured ships
Maritime incidents in 1761